Highway 345 (AR 345, Ark. 345, and Hwy. 345) is a designation for two north–south state highways in Baxter County, Arkansas. A western segment of the route runs  between U.S. Route 62 Business (US 62 Bus.) in Cotter and US 62/US 412 in Gassville. An eastern segment runs  from US 62 to AR 126 in Gassville.

Route description

Western segment
AR 345 begins at the intersection of US 62 Bus., Combs Avenue, and Cotter Road in Cotter. It first heads south on Cotter Road crossing a railroad at-grade. It runs northeast through the southern part of Cotter paralleling the White River before zig-zagging its way north when it enters Gassville and terminates at US 62/US 412.

Eastern segment
The other segment of AR 345 begins at the intersection of Lakeview Drive and US 62/US 412.

History
The short section in Gassville was created to serve an industrial area on May 28, 1969, initially only running due north as Lakeview Drive. The route was extended east from the Mar-Bax shirt factory along Vine Street to Highway 126 on July 28, 1977. The second segment was created on May 23, 1973 pursuant to Act 9 of 1973 by the Arkansas General Assembly.

Major intersections

See also

References

External links

345
Transportation in Baxter County, Arkansas
State highways in the United States shorter than one mile